Charles Lee Bufford (born 1953 or 1954) is an American man who was initially convicted of robbing and murdering William Roland Cooper, Jr., a probate judge in Wilcox County, Alabama, but was later retried and found not guilty. He had been sentenced to the death penalty, but his murder conviction was overturned when part of the death penalty law in Georgia was ruled unconstitutional. He was retried, but the prosecution was unable to produce sufficient evidence in his second trial.

Background

Charles Lee Bufford had been convicted of auto theft and was incarcerated in the Wilcox County jail for a brief sentence when he was temporarily released to the custody of Roland Cooper, a probate judge and former Alabama state senator. The program allowing this type of work release was unofficial and allowed citizens to take informal, temporary custody of inmates for the day. Bufford was 23 at the time, and Cooper sought Bufford's help in his garden.

Roland Cooper was a former Alabama state senator and had been given the nickname "the Wily Fox of Wilcox". His legislative tenure lasted almost 20 years, and he had been regarded as one of the state's most well-known and effective lawmakers. He had then resigned his Senate seat upon his appointment as probate judge for Wilcox County by Governor George Wallace.

The crimes and arrest

Roland Cooper was killed on April 30, 1977. That evening, Bufford was found driving Cooper's vehicle toward Selma, several miles away from Cooper's home. He said he had consumed six beers, and he was arrested for driving under the influence.  Cooper's body was discovered at his home in the garden. He was age 63.

When giving a statement to police, Bufford admitted to losing his temper and hitting Cooper in the head with a garden tool, but he stated that when he left the scene, Cooper was still alive. He said the attack was in response to Cooper cussing him for improperly planting corn in the garden.

Trials

Bufford was found guilty of murder and robbery on May 19, 1978, and he was sentenced to the death penalty. 

However, part of the Alabama death penalty law under which Bufford had been convicted was ruled unconstitutional in 1980. Bufford's conviction was overturned and he was given a new trial.  At the new trial, Bufford was represented by two attorneys, William Faile and John Kelly. The prosecution was unable to produce much evidence at the new trial and the jury acquitted Bufford of the crimes after only two hours of deliberation.  

Several factors led to the jury's decision to free Bufford, even though he had previously admitted to attacking Cooper. Bufford's handwritten confession had been destroyed without explanation, and the typed version presented at the trial was missing key details. Additionally, in an email to a reporter, one juror said the jury's rationale was that "We thought four years was enough for what he did."

Release
On November 12, 1981, Bufford was released from the penal system.

As of April 2015, Bufford was one of eight men who had been sentenced to execution in Alabama who were later set free in the 39 years since the death penalty law was reinstated there in 1976.

Footnotes

References

External links

 
 
  (updated January 13, 2019)

Year of birth missing (living people)
Living people